Fair Oaks Elementary School may refer to:

an elementary school in Redwood City, California
part of the Cobb County School District